The Pine Grove Community House in Manzanita, Oregon, United States, was completed in 1933 and added to the National Register of Historic Places on July 3, 2017.

See also
 National Register of Historic Places listings in Tillamook County, Oregon

References

External links
 

1933 establishments in Oregon
Buildings and structures completed in 1933
Buildings and structures in Tillamook County, Oregon
National Register of Historic Places in Tillamook County, Oregon